The 1994 UST Growling Tigers men's basketball team represented University of Santo Tomas in the 57th season of the University Athletic Association of the Philippines. The men's basketball tournament for the school year 1994–95 began on July 16, 1994, and the host school for the season was National University.

UST finished third at the end of the double round-robin eliminations, winning eight games against four losses. Even as the Adamson Falcons were suspended for the year due to eligibility violations involving former UST high school player Marlou Aquino, the Tigers still found themselves struggling in the first round as they barely made it to fourth place in the standings with a 3–3 record. They managed to win four straight games in the next round, including a 68–66 win over the De La Salle Green Archers which prevented them from getting their own season sweep and an outright championship.

They defeated the No. 2-ranked UE Red Warriors in two games of their Final Four pairing to overcome their twice-to-win disadvantage and advance to the Finals against La Salle. The Tigers yielded a 74–77 loss to the Archers in Game 1 of the best-of-three series, but were able to extend it to a third and deciding game after an 87–75 Game 2 victory. They had succeeded in defending the crown when they won in Game 3 by a single point at 77–76. The Tigers were able to wrest the lead from La Salle when Bal David converted both his free throws off a foul from the Archers' Elmer Lago with six seconds left. It was the team's first back-to-back title since winning a three peat from 1951 until 1953. They also helped to achieve the UAAP's first and only triple championship after their junior and women's team earlier won the titles in their respective divisions.

Dennis Espino, who had poured his frustration out of getting excluded from the Asian Games-bound national team into the Tigers' championship run was named season MVP for the second straight year. He was looking forward to representing the country and even had to drop 15 units of his college load and delay graduation just to be able to keep up with practices of both squads, but was then relegated as a reserve along with two amateur players after the Philippine Basketball Association allowed the inclusion of other professional players to the team.

Roster

Depth chart

Roster changes

Subtractions

Additions

Schedule and results

UAAP games 

Elimination games were played in a double round-robin format. All games were aired on RPN 9 by Silverstar Sports.

Postseason tournaments 

Notes

Awards

Players drafted into the PBA 
Dennis Espino was picked first overall in the 1995 PBA draft by the Nat Canson-led Sta. Lucia Realtors team on January 8, 1995. Edmund Reyes and Bal David also got selected in the same rookie draft, with Reyes earning a first-round seventh overall selection and David in the third round as the 22nd pick.

References 

UST Growling Tigers basketball team seasons
UAAP Season 57